How Dark the Nights Are on the Black Sea is a 1989 Soviet comedy film directed by Vasili Pichul. It was screened in the Un Certain Regard section at the 1990 Cannes Film Festival.

Cast
 Aleksei Zharkov as Stepanych, seasoned conman
 Natalya Negoda as Lena 
 Anastasiya Vertinskaya as Lena's mother
 Alexander Lenkov as Lena's father
 Anna Tikhonova as Jeanne, shopgirl
 Grigori Manukov as Oleg Strelnikov
 Aleksandr Negreba as head of theatre
 Aleksandr Mironov as policeman
 Vatslav Dvorzhetsky as Fedor Fedorovich Strelnikov
 Andrei Sokolov as Boris, Stepanych's son
 Igor Zolotovitsky as Gubanischev
 Levan Mskhiladze as Sasha, Lena's former groom
 Maria Yevstigneyeva as Marina, Lena's former friend
 Yuri Nazarov as Glazier, criminal
 Boris Smorchkov as Jeanne's father
 Inna Ulyanova as lady in the restaurant
 Yervant Arzumanyan as Ashot Aramovich, theatre director
 Alexandra Tabakova as Masha
 Andrey Fomin as playwright
 Nadezhda Markina as Sonya, Oleg Strelnikov's wife

References

External links

1989 films
1989 comedy films
Soviet comedy films
Russian comedy films
1980s Russian-language films
Films directed by Vasili Pichul